Arnaud Di Pasquale (born 11 February 1979) is a former professional tennis player from France.

Tennis career

Juniors
Di Pasquale excelled as a junior, posting a 103–25 record in singles and reaching the No. 1 ranking in December 1997 (and No. 17 in doubles). He won the boys' singles competition at the 1997 US Open (and made the semifinals of the Australian and French Open).

Junior Grand Slam finals

Singles: 1 (1 title)

Doubles: 1 (1 runner-up)

Pro tour
Di Pasquale is best known winning the bronze medal at the 2000 Summer Olympics in the men's singles event. He beat Nicolas Kiefer, Vladimir Voltchkov, Juan Carlos Ferrero and rising Roger Federer in the bronze medal match, but more surprising was his straight-sets victory over the well established Magnus Norman of Sweden, in the tournament's third round. He also reached the fourth round of the French Open in both 1999 and 2002 and won one singles title (in Palermo, 1999).

Major finals

Olympic finals

Singles: 1 (1 bronze medal)

ATP career finals

Singles: 2 (1 title, 1 runner-up)

ATP Challenger and ITF Futures finals

Singles: 7 (2–5)

Performance timeline

Singles

References

External links
 
 

French expatriate sportspeople in Morocco
French expatriate sportspeople in Switzerland
French male tennis players
Olympic bronze medalists for France
Olympic medalists in tennis
Olympic tennis players of France
Sportspeople from Casablanca
Tennis players from Geneva
Tennis players at the 2000 Summer Olympics
US Open (tennis) junior champions
1979 births
Living people
Medalists at the 2000 Summer Olympics
Grand Slam (tennis) champions in boys' singles